Masami Life is the 13th album by Masami Okui, released on 3 October 2007.

Track listing
It's my life
 Commercial song for Iromelo Mix
 Lyrics: Masami Okui
 Composition: Monta
 Arrangement: Toshiro Yabuki, Tsutomu Ohira
Limited War
 Lyrics: Masami Okui
 Composition, arrangement: Monta
-w-
 Lyrics: Masami Okui
 Composition: Monta
 Arrangement: Macaroni, Monta
-GAIA2012
 Lyrics: Masami Okui
 Composition, arrangement: Mikio Sakai
Ring
 TV drama Jikuu Keisatsu Wecker Signa opening song
 Lyrics: Masami Okui
 Composition, arrangement: Monta
Remote Viewing
 PS2 Game Routes PE and Routes Portable opening song
 Lyrics: Masami Okui
 Composition: Michio Kinugasa
 Arrangement: Hideyuki Daichi Suzuki

 Lyrics, composition: Masami Okui
 Arrangement: Hiroshi Uesugi

 Lyrics: Masami Okui
 Composition, arrangement: Rala

 Lyrics, composition: Masami Okui
 Arrangement: IPPEI
 PC Game Muv-Luv Unlimited soundtrack
Mobile Magic
 Lyrics: Masami Okui
 Composition, arrangement: Macaroni
Wonderful Days
 Lyrics: Masami Okui
 Composition, arrangement: Toshiro Yabuki
I Wish
 Lyrics: Masami Okui
 Composition: Minami Kuribayashi
 Arrangement: Tsutomu Ohira

Sources
Official website: Makusonia

2007 albums
Masami Okui albums